Yourself and Yours is a 2016 South Korean drama film directed by Hong Sang-soo. The film was screened at the 2016 Toronto International Film Festival.

Plot
The plot revolves around the couple Yeong-soo (played by Kim Joo-hyuk) and Min-jeong (played by Lee Yoo-young). After a fight between them, they decide to take a break in their relationship. The next day, Min-jeong vanishes without a trace. Instead a woman shows up looking exactly like Min-jeong. She seems interested in looking for "Mr. Right" and dating every man in the town where they live. One day Min-jeong returns.

Cast
Kim Joo-hyuk as Yeong-soo
Lee Yoo-young as Min-jeong
Kim Eui-sung as Joong-haeng
Kwon Hae-hyo as Jae-young

Reception
On review aggregator website Rotten Tomatoes, the film has a 94% approval rating based on 32 reviews, with an average rating of 7.5/10. The site's consensus states "Yourself and Yours uses one couple's ups and downs to playfully interrogate the thrills and pitfalls of romantic relationships". On Metacritic, Yourself and Yours holds 75 out of a 100 rank based on 11 critics, indicating "generally favorable reviews".

In his review for Variety, Scott Tobias described the plot as an "inspired reversal" of the film That Obscure Object of Desire.

References

External links

2016 drama films
Films directed by Hong Sang-soo
South Korean drama films
2010s Korean-language films
2010s South Korean films